The 1895 Liverpool East Toxteth by-election was a parliamentary by-election held in England on 29 November 1895 for the House of Commons constituency of Liverpool East Toxteth.

Vacancy
On 14 November the Conservative Member of Parliament (MP), Baron Henry de Worms was ennobled as Baron Pirbright.
His previous title was as a Hereditary Baron of the Austrian Empire, but his British peerage gave him a seat in the House of Lords, and automatically disqualified him from the Commons.

Candidates
The Conservatives selected as their candidate Augustus Frederick Warr, a local solicitor
working in the field of commercial law. Warr was a Liverpool City Councillor and a former President of the Liverpool Law Society. His father, who died later that year, had been the vicar of St Saviour's Church in Liverpool.

Result 
The writ was received on 26 November, and Friday 29 November was set as nomination day, with polling on Tuesday 3 December.

However, at the close of nominations on Friday, Warr was the only candidate, so he was returned unopposed without any need for a vote.

Aftermath 
Warr was re-elected unopposed at the next general election, in 1900. He resigned his seat in October 1902,
and died in 1908.

References

See also
 Liverpool East Toxteth constituency
 Toxteth
 1902 Liverpool East Toxteth by-election
 1916 Liverpool East Toxteth by-election
 1929 Liverpool East Toxteth by-election
 1931 Liverpool East Toxteth by-election
 List of United Kingdom by-elections (1885–1900)

1895 elections in the United Kingdom
East Toxteth, 1895
1895 in England
Toxteth
1890s in Liverpool
November 1895 events